Jan Veentjer (13 February 1938 – 2 April 2020) was a field hockey goalkeeper from the Netherlands. He competed  at the 1964 Summer Olympics, where his team finished in seventh place.

He died in 2020 at the age of 82 from the consequences of an infection with COVID-19.

References

External links
 

1938 births
2020 deaths
Deaths from the COVID-19 pandemic in the Netherlands
Dutch male field hockey players
Field hockey players at the 1964 Summer Olympics
Olympic field hockey players of the Netherlands
Sportspeople from Rotterdam